Jennie Creek is a stream in the U.S. state of West Virginia.

Jennie Creek was named after Jennie Wiley, a pioneer settler.

See also
List of rivers of West Virginia

References

Rivers of Mingo County, West Virginia
Rivers of Wayne County, West Virginia
Rivers of West Virginia